Museum Night is an annual event in Croatia. During one night in the year (usually on the last Friday in January), the entrance fee to most of the museums in Croatia is waived. Museum Night was first held in December 2005, with only six museums from Zagreb area participating, drawing 10,000 visitors. The event evolved to include museums in the rest of Croatia in the following years, with over 200 museums participating. In 2014, there were 360,000 museum-goers during the Museum Night, with 800 performances held.

References

External links 

 

Entertainment events in Croatia
Museums in Croatia
Recurring events established in 2005
2005 establishments in Croatia
Museum events
Winter events in Croatia